"Socialism is Good" is a Chinese propaganda song from before the Cultural Revolution, composed in 1958 by Li Huanzhi, with lyrics written by Xi Yang.

Lyrics

Cover versions 
Chinese rock musician Zhang Chu covered the song for his 1992 album Red Rock.

Notes

References

External links 
  (original version)
  (DPRK version sung in the Chinese language)

Political party songs
Mandarin-language songs
Cultural Revolution
1958 songs
Chinese patriotic songs
Propaganda in China